Lake Butrint is a salt lagoon south of Saranda, Albania, located in direct proximity of the Ionian Sea. It is surrounded by dense forested hills, rocky coast and complemented by saltwater and freshwater marshlands. At the south, the Vivari Channel connects the lagoon to the sea.

Flora and fauna 
Butrint is particularly known for the diversity of flora and fauna. The southern portion of the lake is situated within the boundaries of Butrint National Park and has been recognised as a wetland of international importance by designation under the Ramsar Convention. The lake has been as well identified as an Important Bird and Plant Area, because it supports significant numbers of bird and plant species.

See also 

 Butrinti
 Butrint National Park
 Venetian Acropolis Castle
 Venetian Triangular Castle
 Channel of Vivari
 Geography of Albania
 Lakes of Albania & Lagoons of Albania

References 

 

Butrint
Butrint
Wetlands of Albania
Geography of Vlorë County
Tourist attractions in Vlorë County
Important Bird Areas of Albania
Ramsar sites in Albania
Albanian Ionian Sea Coast
Butrint National Park